Mitterteich (Northern Bavarian: Miederdeich) is a municipality in the district of Tirschenreuth, in Bavaria, Germany. It is situated 10 km northwest of Tirschenreuth, and 17 km southwest of Cheb.

Notable people
 Theobald Schrems (1893 – 1963), music educator and organist
 Heiner Hopfner (1941 – 2014), tenor

See also
SCHOTT-Rohrglas GmbH

References

Tirschenreuth (district)